The 2013–14 NC State Wolfpack men's basketball team represented North Carolina State University during the 2013–14 NCAA Division I men's basketball season. The Wolfpack, led by third year head coach Mark Gottfried, played their home games at PNC Arena and were members of the Atlantic Coast Conference. They finished the season 22–14, 9–9 in ACC play to finish in a three way tie for seventh place. They advanced to the semifinals of the ACC tournament where they lost to Duke. They received an at-large bid to the NCAA tournament where they defeated Xavier in the First Four before losing in the second round to Saint Louis. T. J. Warren, who led the ACC in scoring, was voted ACC player of the year for 2013–14.

Off season

Departures

Class of 2013 signees

Roster

Schedule and results

|-
!colspan=12 style="background:#E00000; color:white;"| Exhibition

|-
!colspan=12 style="background:#E00000; color:white;"| Non-conference regular season

|-
!colspan=12 style="background:#E00000; color:white;"| ACC regular season

|-
!colspan=12 style="background:#E00000; color:white;"| ACC Tournament

|-
!colspan=12 style="background:#E00000; color:white;"| NCAA tournament

References

NC State Wolfpack men's basketball seasons
NC State
North Carolina State
2013 in sports in North Carolina
2014 in sports in North Carolina